Q2K is the seventh studio album by progressive metal band Queensrÿche, released on 14 September 1999. It was the only Queensrÿche studio album to feature guitarist Kelly Gray, who, in the early 1980s, was in a band called Myth with vocalist Geoff Tate. "Breakdown" was released as the first single off Q2K. "The Right Side of My Mind" was released as the band's first music video since the album Promised Land and has had occasional airplay on VH1 Classic, which also premiered it in a special co-hosted by Geoff Tate.

On August 29, 2006, Rhino Entertainment released an expanded & remastered edition of Q2K which included four bonus tracks. In Canada, the album was released by Anthem Records.

Two songs "Discipline" and "Monologue" still remain unreleased after Q2K sessions.

Track listing

Personnel
Queensrÿche
Geoff Tate - vocals
Michael Wilton - lead guitar
Kelly Gray - rhythm guitar
Eddie Jackson - bass
Scott Rockenfield - drums

Technical personnel
Queensrÿche - production, engineering
Kelly Gray - mixing
Jon Plum - mixing at London Bridge Studios, Seattle
Eddy Schreyer - mastering

Charts

External links
 Q2K Album Page - Queensryche Official Website

References

1999 albums
Queensrÿche albums
Atlantic Records albums
Rhino Records albums
Albums produced by Kelly Gray